Mario Finarolli (born 31 January 1953) is an Argentine former footballer who played as a midfielder and coach.

Career
Finarolli played professional football in the Argentine Primera División and Spain's La Liga. He began playing football in Club Atlético River Plate youth system, and turned professional with the club in 1971. Finarolli scored 53 goals in 216 Argentine Primera División matches with River Plate, Club Atlético Atlanta, Club Atlético Vélez Sarsfield, Argentinos Juniors, Rosario Central, Club Atlético Sarmiento and Club Atlético Temperley, He finished his career in the regional leagues with Club Atlético Douglas Haig.

After he retired from playing, Finarolli began a career as a football manager. He led Sarmineto, Tigre, Temperley, Club Almirante Brown and Club Atlético Nueva Chicago in the Primera B Nacional (second level). Finarolli lead Defensores de Salto to a historic promotion to Torneo Argentino C (the regionalized fourth level) in 2007. He returned to manage the club in 2017.

References

External links
Profile at BDFA.com.ar

1953 births
Living people
Sportspeople from Buenos Aires Province
Argentine footballers
Association football defenders
Argentine Primera División players
Club Atlético River Plate footballers
Club Atlético Atlanta footballers
Club Atlético Vélez Sarsfield footballers
Argentinos Juniors footballers
Rosario Central footballers
Club Atlético Sarmiento footballers
Club Atlético Temperley footballers
Elche CF players
Argentine football managers
Club Atlético Sarmiento managers
Club Atlético Tigre managers
Club Atlético Atlanta managers
Nueva Chicago managers
Almagro managers